Carl Friedrich Wilhelm, Prince of Leiningen (14 August 1724 – 9 January 1807) was a Prince of the Holy Roman Empire and the first ruler of the Principality of Leiningen.

Life 
Carl Friedrich Wilhelm was the eldest son of Friedrich Magnus, Count of Leiningen-Dagsburg-Hartenburg (1703-1756), and his wife, Countess Anna Christine Eleonore von Wurmbrand-Stuppach (1698-1763). He succeeded his father on the latter's death, 28 October 1756.

On 3 July 1779, he was made a Prince of the Holy Roman Empire, becoming the first Prince of Leiningen. In 1801, he was deprived of his lands on the left bank of the Rhine, namely Hardenburg, Dagsburg and Durkheim, by France, but in 1803 received the secularized Amorbach Abbey as an ample compensation for these losses. Hitherto his titles were: Imperial Prince of Leiningen, Count palatine of Mosbach, Count of Düren, Lord of Miltenberg, Amorbach, Bischofsheim, Boxberg, Schüpf and Lauda.

A few years later, the short-lived Principality of Leiningen at Amorbach was mediatized into the Kingdom of Bavaria.

Marriage 
On 24 June 1749, the Prince married his first cousin Countess Christiane Wilhelmine Luise of Solms-Rödelheim and Assenheim (1736-1803), daughter of Wilhelm Carl Ludwig, Count of Solms-Rödelheim and Assenheim (1699-1778), by his wife, Countess Maria Margareta Leopolda von Wurmbrand-Stuppach (1701-1756). His wife died on 6 January 1803. They had a son and three daughters:

 Princess Elisabeth Christiane Marianne of Leiningen (27 October 1753 – 16 February 1792); married on 17 May 1768 to Count Karl Ludwig of Salm-Grumbach.
 Princess Charlotte Luise Polyxena of Leiningen (27 May 1755 – 13 January 1785); married 1 September 1776 to Franz, Count of Erbach-Erbach.
 Princess Karoline Sophie Wilhelmine of Leiningen (4 April 1757 – 18 March 1832); married 21 September 1773 Count Friedrich Magnus of Solms-Wildenfels.
 Emich Karl, Prince of Leiningen (27 September 1763 – 4 July 1814); succeeded his father as second Prince of Leiningen.

Ancestry

References 

Sources include:
 

1724 births
1807 deaths
People from Bad Dürkheim
Carl Friedrich Wilhelm, 1st Prince of Leiningen
Carl Friedrich Wilhelm
Carl Friedrich Wilhelm, 1st Prince of Leiningen